Amar Singh Damar (27 September 1925 – 30 April 1999) was an Indian politician. He was elected to the lower House of Parliament, the Lok Sabha, from  Jhabua, Madhya Pradesh, India as a member of the Indian National Congress.

Damar died in Jhabua on 30 April 1999, at the age of 73.

References

External links
Official biographical sketch in Parliament of India website

1925 births
1999 deaths
India MPs 1952–1957
India MPs 1957–1962
Indian National Congress politicians